Cortella is a surname. Notable people with the surname include:

Antonio Cortella (1896–1962), Argentine footballer
Mario Sergio Cortella (born 1954), Brazilian philosopher, writer, educator, and speaker
Sara Cortella (born 2002), Italian volleyball player

See also
Corella (disambiguation)